Fabienne Delsol is a French singer who performs primarily in English. Influenced by the 1960s, her music is a mix of garage rock, pop and psychedelic music.

Biography
Delsol was born and grew up in Limoges, France. In 1995, she moved to England, attracted by the London music scene. There she met the producers Liam Watson and Ed Deegan, and became the lead singer of the Bristols, a group produced by Watson and Deegan.

That same year the group's first single, "Questions I Can't Answer", was released by Damaged Goods. Delsol toured Europe for much of the next five years with other Damaged Goods acts, including Thee Headcoats, and Cee Bee Beaumont.

After two albums and three singles, Delsol decided to pursue a solo career. In 2004, she and producer Liam Watson released No Time for Sorrows. The thirteen-track album had twelve songs in English and one in French.

Between You and Me, Delsol's second solo album, was also produced by Liam Watson. The album includes collaborations with George Miller and Peter Bernhard. Of the fourteen tracks, three are in French.

Delsol's third solo album On My Mind was released in 2010. Her fourth album, Four was released in 2019 and was called "possibly her strongest...She commands your attention with affecting melodies..."

In April 2019, her song I'm Gonna Haunt You was on the Killing Eve soundtrack.

Discography

Albums with the Bristols
 Introducing… the Bristols (Damaged Goods, 2000)
 Tune in With… the Bristols (Damaged Goods, 2001)
 The Best of Fabienne Delsol & the Bristols (Damaged Goods, 2007)

Solo albums
 No Time for Sorrows (Damaged Goods, 2004)
 Between You and Me (Damaged Goods, 2007)
 On My Mind (Damaged Goods, 2010)
 Four (Damaged Goods, 2019)

References

External links
 Fabienne Delsol at Damaged Goods
 Fabienne Delsol at Myspace

English-language singers from France
French emigrants to England
French women singers
Living people
People from Limoges
Year of birth missing (living people)